General elections were held in Kuwait on 5 July 2003 to elect the 50 members of the National Assembly. As political parties are illegal in the country, all candidates stood as independents.

Results
26 of the elected members were identified being as supporters of the government and Independents. Three as liberals and 21 as Islamists (Sunni and Shia).

References

Elections in Kuwait
2003 in Kuwait
Kuwait